Brian P. Coppola (born February 5, 1957 in Lawrence, Massachusetts) is a chemistry professor at the University of Michigan.

Raised in Methuen, Massachusetts, and Derry, New Hampshire, Coppola is the eldest of four children of Frank and Shirley Coppola.  He graduated from Pinkerton Academy in 1974. In 1978, he received a B.S. from the University of New Hampshire, then was awarded a Ph.D. from the University of Wisconsin–Madison in 1984, having carried out research under the supervision of Barry M. Trost. In 1982, he joined the faculty at the University of Wisconsin–Whitewater. He was hired at the University of Michigan in 1986 as a Visiting Assistant Professor, and then as a Lecturer (1987).  In 1996–1997, his tenure case established a new policy within the UM College of Literature, Science and the Arts: that faculty positions within the College might be based on discipline-centered teaching and learning, that is, the interdisciplinary combination of the discipline and the learning sciences.  The details of his case, and that of three other individuals with comparable career paths, is the basis of the book Balancing Acts by Mary Taylor Huber.  Coppola was appointed as Arthur F. Thurnau Professor in 2001, and became a Full Professor of Chemistry in 2001–2002. He served as the Associate Chair of the chemistry department at the University of Michigan from 2002–2012. In 2013, he was appointed as the department's first Associate Chair for Educational Development & Practice, where he directs the department's programs for student professional development (CSIE|UM for the future faculty; CALC|UM for the future industry/private section professionals; Master's degree options; international programs).

In 1998, Professor Coppola was appointed as the Grand Editor (editor in chief) for the quarterly publication of the Professional Chemistry fraternity, Alpha Chi Sigma, The Hexagon of Alpha Chi Sigma. The most noteworthy articles developed for The Hexagon are those of the Rediscovery of the Elements series, which document the history of the discovery of the chemical elements through research and travel to the original sites of their discoveries, authored by Professor James L. Marshall (University of North Texas) and his wife, Jenny.

Between 2007 and 2011, Coppola, along with Joseph Krajcik (Michigan State University, School of Education), co-founded the University of Michigan IDEA Institute (Instructional Development & Educational Assessment).

From 2010–2015, he was an Associate Editor for The Journal for Research in Science Teaching, and co-edited two special issues on Discipline-Centered Post-Secondary Science Education Research (vol 50(6) and vol 51(6) ). He has also served on the editorial boards for The Chemical Educator, International Journal of Science Education, Journal of Chemical Education, and Journal of College Science Teaching.

As of 2016 his research interests were listed as, "mechanism and synthetic applications of dipolar cycloaddition reactions and in chemistry curriculum design, implementation, assessment, and evaluation."

Awards and honors
 Phi Beta Kappa, 1977
 Sigma Xi, 1978
 Golden Apple Award for outstanding teaching, University of Michigan, 1994.
 Undergraduate Computational Science Education Award, United States Department of Energy, 1996.
 Amoco Foundation Award for Excellence in Undergraduate Teaching, 1999.
 Arthur F. Thurnau Professor of Chemistry, University of Michigan, 2001.
 Fellow of the American Association for the Advancement of Science, 2002.
 NSTA Outstanding Undergraduate Science Teacher Award, 2003.
 Society for College Science Teachers (SCST)/Kendall-Hunt Outstanding Undergraduate Science Teacher Award, 2004/5.
 CASE/Carnegie State of Michigan Professor of the Year, 2004.
 James Flack Norris Award for Outstanding Achievement in the Teaching of Chemistry, 2006.
 CASE/Carnegie United States National Professor of the Year (doctoral), 2009.
 Pinkerton Academy Alumni Hall of Fame, 2011.
 Robert Foster Cherry Award (finalist), 2011.
 Robert Foster Cherry Award for Great Teaching, Awardee for 2012-14.
 Fellow of the American Chemical Society, 2015
 Michigan Association of State Universities Distinguished Professor of the Year, 2016.

Selected recent publications
(1) Coppola, B. P. “Broad & Capacious: A New Norm for Instructional Development in a Research Setting” Change, 2016, 48 (2), 34-42.

(2) Coppola, Brian P. “Where is the line?” In R. A. Duschl & A. S. Bismack (Eds.), “Reconceptualizing STEM Education: The central role of practices.” London: Routledge; 2016, pp. 131–142.

(3) Coppola, B. P. “Do Real Work, Not Homework” In, Garcia-Martinez, J.; Serrano-Torregrosa, E., Eds. Chemistry Education: Best Practices, Opportunities and Trends. Weinheim, Germany: Wiley-VCH, 2015; pp. 203–257.

(4) Coppola, B. P. "An Inevitable Moment: US Brain Drain" Change 2015, 47 (4), 36-45.

(5) Coppola, B. P. “Making Your Case: Ten Questions for Departments and Individuals Building an Argument for Work in Discipline-Centered Education” International Journal on the Scholarship of Teaching and Learning 2011, 5. http://www.georgiasouthern.edu/ijsotl.

References

1957 births
Living people
University of Michigan faculty
University of New Hampshire alumni
University of Wisconsin–Madison alumni
University of Wisconsin–Whitewater faculty
People from Lawrence, Massachusetts
People from Methuen, Massachusetts
People from Derry, New Hampshire
Scientists from Michigan
20th-century American chemists
21st-century American chemists
Pinkerton Academy alumni